Gigliola Gonzaga, also called Egidiola Gonzaga (1325-1377), was lady of Milan by marriage to Matteo II Visconti, lord of Milan, between 1349 and 1355.

Notes

1325 births
1377 deaths
House of Gonzaga
14th-century Italian women
People from Mantua